The Central States Aircraft Model 22, Velie Monocoupe, or Monocoupe Model 22  was the first in a series of small, high-performance high-wing monoplanes from Monocoupe Aircraft.

Development
The Monocooupe model 22 was drawn up by Clayton Folkerts to Luscombe's design criteria.

Design
The Model 22 was a high-wing conventional geared aircraft with side by side seating. The prototype was powered by a 60 hp  Detroit air-cat engine. Some were installed with Anzani engines.

Operational history

The prototype monocoupe was first flown on 1 April 1927. The certified version of the Model 22 was approved in January 1928. By the time of certification, the Velie company had bought Central States Aircraft, switching production of the Model 22 with the air-cat engine to the Model 70 with a Velie M-5. Approximately 20 Model 22's were built.

Variants

Model 70 - The production successor with a Velie M-5 engine

Specifications (Monocoupe Model 22)

References

1920s United States civil utility aircraft
Single-engined tractor aircraft
High-wing aircraft
Aircraft first flown in 1927